Connor Bailey (born 13 August 2002) is a speedway rider from Australia.

Career
In 2019, he signed for the Glasgow Tigers in the SGB Championship 2019 and the Belle Vue Colts in the NDL.

He remained with Glasgow for the 2021 and 2022 seasons. In 2022, he was named as the number 8 rider for Belle Vue Aces in the top tier of British Speedway, riding for the Aces in the SGB Premiership 2022 where he helped Belle Vue win the league title.

Bailey joined Redcar Bears for the SGB Championship 2023. and the Workington Comets for the 2023 National Development League speedway season.

References 

2002 births
Living people
Australian speedway riders
Belle Vue Aces riders
Belle Vue Colts riders
Glasgow Tigers riders
Redcar Bears riders
Workington Comets riders
Sportspeople from Perth, Western Australia